Tom Holmes (born 5 January 1990) is an English rugby union player for Nottingham RFC in the RFU Championship where he is club captain. He signed from the Rotherham Titans in 2016. He previously played for Sale Sharks. He plays as a lock.

As well as his playing commitments, Holmes is the forwards coach at Long Eaton RFC

Born in Manchester, Holmes was scouted by Sale Sharks at 16. He played for England each year until Under 20 level when a severe ankle injury left him out of action for six months. Holmes was dropped from Sale and played for Sedgley Park before re-signing for Sale in 2013.

On 1 May 2014, Holmes signed a permanent deal with Rotherham Titans who compete in the RFU Championship.

References

External links
Guinness Premiership profile

1990 births
Living people
Sale Sharks players
Rugby union locks
English rugby union players
Rugby union players from Manchester